Joe Don Rooney (born September 13, 1975 in Baxter Springs, KS) is an American musician. From 1999 to 2021, he was the lead guitarist and high octave harmony singer in the American country pop trio Rascal Flatts.

In addition to the electric guitar, Rooney plays the acoustic and bass guitars, as well as mandolin & banjo. His influences include guitarists Chet Atkins, Eric Clapton and Jeff Beck.

Personal life
Joe Don Rooney's first band formed in 1992 under the name Uncle Thumbtack. In addition to Rooney playing lead guitar and singing backup harmony, this band included bass guitarist Gregory Fitzgibbon, acoustic guitarist Erin Fitzgibbon, drummer Colin Frayser, and rhythm guitarist Jason.  Like future bandmate Jay DeMarcus, he also played in Chely Wright's band before Rascal Flatts. Rooney frequently jammed with family member musicians Justin Speer, Tracy Conder, and Jeramy Essary (to whom he later dedicated "I'm Movin' On").

Rooney married former beauty queen Tiffany Fallon on April 23, 2006. She was Miss Georgia USA in 2001 and 2nd runner-up for the Miss USA 2001 competition. She was also the 2005 Playmate of the Year. The couple was featured in the Playboy Cyber Club's celebrity photographer section, with the nude pictorial of Fallon being shot by Rooney himself. The couple have three children: son Jagger Donovan Rooney (born May 31, 2008) and daughters Raquel Blue Rooney (born September 7, 2010) and Devon Olivia Rooney (born September 25, 2014). The couple separated in 2022.

In 2016, Rooney signed Dylan Brady to an artist development deal. Together, Brady and Rooney produced Brady's first single, "Shifting Gears," which was released in August 2018. In 2019, Rooney produced Brady's singles "Over Us" and "I Hate California."

On September 9, 2021, he was arrested for and charged in Tennessee with driving under the influence after crashing his vehicle into a tree line. He sustained no injuries in the crash. On June 1, 2022, Rooney pleaded guilty to the charges; he was sentenced to one year in jail, with all but two days of the sentence suspended, and the loss of his driver's license.

Discography

Rascal Flatts (2000)
Melt (2002)
Feels Like Today (2004)
Me and My Gang (2006)
Still Feels Good (2007)
Unstoppable (2009)
Nothing Like This (2010)
Changed (2012)
Rewind (2014)
The Greatest Gift of All (2016)
Back to Us (2017)

References

External links

Rascal Flatts Official Site

1975 births
American country guitarists
American male guitarists
Living people
People from Baxter Springs, Kansas
People from Ottawa County, Oklahoma
Rascal Flatts members
Guitarists from Kansas
Country musicians from Oklahoma
21st-century American guitarists
21st-century American male musicians